The Bristol Railroad was a short-line railroad in Addison County, Vermont.

Businessmen in the town of Bristol chartered the railroad in 1890, and the grand opening was on January 5, 1892, although service had actually begun on November 25, 1891, when a car of potatoes was shipped out of Bristol.

The railroad never did much business, and it is unlikely that it ever hauled more than a three-car train.  Freight traffic was mostly agricultural.  A trip could take as little as 18 minutes, if the locomotive had only one car to handle.

The railroad was abandoned during the Great Depression.  The last run was on April 12, 1930.  One man, John S. Burt, rode both the grand opening train and the final train.  Both the Bristol and New Haven Junction stations survive.

Locomotives

References

Transportation in Addison County, Vermont
Defunct Vermont railroads